Augustinus Wilhelmus "Guus" Haak (born 17 April 1937) is a Dutch former footballer who played for Feyenoord and was part of their European Cup victory in 1970. He earned 14 caps for the Netherlands national football team.

References

 Profile

1937 births
Living people
Dutch footballers
Netherlands international footballers
ADO Den Haag players
Feyenoord players
SVV Scheveningen players
Eredivisie players
Footballers from The Hague
Association football defenders
UEFA Champions League winning players